Guifang Li is a FPCE Professor of Optics, Electrical & Computer Engineering and Physics at University of Central Florida, Orlando, Florida.

Career 
Li holds Ph.D. from the University of Wisconsin–Madison and is an associate editor of Optica and Photonics as well as deputy editor of Optics Express.

Li is a fellow of SPIE, and The Optical Society He was named Fellow of the Institute of Electrical and Electronics Engineers (IEEE) in 2013 for contributions to all-optical signal processing and high-capacity fiber-optic transmission.

In 2015, Li became an elected fellow of the National Academy of Inventors.

References

External links

20th-century births
Living people
University of Wisconsin–Madison alumni
University of Central Florida faculty
Fellow Members of the IEEE
Fellows of SPIE
Fellows of Optica (society)
21st-century American engineers
Year of birth missing (living people)
Place of birth missing (living people)
Optical engineers
American electrical engineers